Basilotritus is a genus of basilosaurid early whale known from the early late Middle Eocene (late Lutetian to Bartonian) Kiev Formation of the Ukraine, Stockletten Formation of Germany, Tongeren Formation of the Netherlands, Giushi Formation of Egypt and the United States (Castle Hayne Formation, North Carolina and Piney Point Formation, Virginia).

Basilotritus uheni 
Basilotritus uheni has been found in the late Middle Eocene (Bartonian) Kiev Formation at Beloskelevatoye, Ukraine, making it the oldest fossil cetacean from Eastern Europe. Its holotype, NMNH-P OF-2096, consists of a partial skeleton.

Basilotritus wardi 
Basilotritus wardi is known from a partial skeleton collected in the late Lutetian (~42 Ma) of North Carolina. It was originally described as a species of the protocetid Eocetus, E. wardii. Because this species displays a mix of protocetid and basilosaurid traits, the original generic assignment was questioned by subsequent authors. This skepticism was confirmed by the discovery of B. uheni, allowing for "E." wardi to be referred to Basilotritus.

References 

Basilosauridae
Prehistoric cetacean genera
Bartonian life
Lutetian life
Eocene mammals of Africa
Fossils of Egypt
Eocene mammals of Europe
Paleogene Germany
Fossils of Germany
Fossils of Ukraine
Eocene mammals of North America
Fossils of the United States
Fossils of North Carolina
Fossil taxa described in 2013
Paleontology in Virginia